Robert Rössle (August 19, 1876 – November 21, 1956) was a German pathologist. He was born in Augsburg and died in Berlin.

In 1900 he received his medical doctorate from Munich, and went to work at the Pathological Institute of the University of Kiel. From 1911 to 1921, he was a professor of general pathology and pathological anatomy at the University of Jena, and from 1922 until 1929 he held a similar position in Basel. In 1929 he succeeded Otto Lubarsch (1860–1933) in the department of pathology at the Charité in Berlin, where he remained until 1948.

Rössle performed pathological investigations in several facets of medicine, including liver disease, allergies, inflammation, cellular pathology and geriatrics. He described aspects associated with a form of secondary biliary cirrhosis that was once referred to as "Hanot–Rössle syndrome" (named in conjunction with French physician Victor Charles Hanot (1844–1896)).

Rössle published over 300 medical papers, and was editor of 39 volumes of Virchow's Archiv für Pathologische Anatomie und Physiologie und für Klinische Medicin (now: Virchows Archiv). Today, the Robert-Rössle-Hospital and Tumor Institute is named in his honor. It is located at the Max-Delbrück-Center of Molecular Medicine at the Humboldt University of Berlin.

References 
 "This article incorporates translated text from an equivalent article at the German Wikipedia".
 Hanot-Rössle syndrome @ Who Named It

German pathologists
1876 births
1956 deaths
Academic staff of the University of Jena
Academic staff of the University of Basel
Physicians from Augsburg
Academic staff of the Humboldt University of Berlin
Officers Crosses of the Order of Merit of the Federal Republic of Germany